Britain's Everyday Heroes is a book by former British Prime Minister Gordon Brown about thirty-three ordinary people whose willing commitment to a cause or a community has informed and inspired Brown. It was published by Mainstream Publishing on 24 July 2007, less than a month after Brown became Prime Minister.

The book was produced in conjunction with East London charity Community Links, who will receive all royalties from sales. According to The Independent, the book had sold fewer than 1,000 copies by March 2010.

References

2007 non-fiction books
Books about the United Kingdom
Books about politics of the United Kingdom
Books by Gordon Brown
Books written by prime ministers of the United Kingdom
Mainstream Publishing books